The Saccardiaceae are a family of fungi in the Ascomycota phylum. This family can not yet be taxonomically classified in any of the ascomycetous classes and orders with any degree of certainty (incertae sedis).
They have a worldwide distribution.

Genera
Genera as accepted by GBIF;
Angatia  (5)
Ascolectus  (1)
Cyanodiscus  (2)
Dictyonella  (7)
Epibelonium  (1)
Johansonia  (14)
Johansoniella  (1)
Masonia  (2)
Microphyma (6)
Myriangiomyces  (1)
Phillipsiella  (9)
Pseudodiscus  (1)
Rivilata  (1)
Saccardia  (3)
Schenckiella  (1)
Vonarxella  (1)
Note: Figures in brackets = how many species per genus

References

External links
Index Fungorum

Ascomycota enigmatic taxa
Ascomycota families
Taxa named by Franz Xaver Rudolf von Höhnel